Bharati Vidyapeeth Institute Of Management & Research, New Delhi Established in 1992, Bharati Vidyapeeth University Institute of Management And Research (BVIMR), New Delhi endures the reputation of being one of the institutes imparting education in management. As a constituent unit amongst 182 institutions of Bharati Vidyapeeth family, which was founded by Hon’ble Dr. Patangraoji Kadam in 1964, the institute has over the past few years emerged.
The institute is under the ambit of Bharati Vidyapeeth University (BVU), Pune as approved by Govt. of India on the recommendation of UGC under Section 3 of UGC Act vide its letter notification No. F. 9 – 16 / 2004 – U3 dated 25 February 2005. It has been offering management & IT programmes.

External links 
 

Universities and colleges in Delhi
All India Council for Technical Education
Business schools in Delhi